Usan-guk, or the State of Usan, occupied Ulleung-do and the adjacent islands  during the Korean Three Kingdoms period. According to the Samguk Sagi, it was conquered by the Silla general Kim Isabu in 512. He is said to have used wooden lions or tigers to intimidate the residents into surrendering. It has been written that the alias of Usan-guk is Ulleung-do. Usan-guk rarely entered into historical records, but appears to have continued a largely autonomous existence until its loss of independence to Goryeo in 930.

History

Legend from Ulleung
A legend from Ulleung island tells a story of King Woohae (于海王), who was so strong that he invaded Tsushima Island to exterminate Japanese pirates. When King Woohae, tried to go back, the king of Tsushima threw a huge party for Woohae and suggested an amicable diplomatic relationship between the two countries, and asked Woohae to marry his third daughter Pungminyeo (豊美女), who was beautiful. Pung became the Empress of Usan, and after this event, Usan began to fall in decadence, and Usan fell in a few years.

Historical records
Earliest records that appear in the Records of the Three Kingdoms indirectly attest the existence of the kingdom, which says "When Wang Qi(王頎) (of Cao Wei) has come to Okjeo to conquer gung (Dongcheon of Goguryeo), he asked a local man whether there are people living in the east sea, and the man replied  there are people living in an island that exists in the eastern seas, and they select a girl to put in the ocean every July."

In Samguk Sagi, it is said that because of general Isabu's threats with wooden lions, Usan chose to be a vassal state to Silla in 512.

In Goryeosa, it is recorded that Usan requested to be submitted under the rule of Goryeo in 930 by sending Baekgil, and todu. In 1018, when Usan was severely affected by jurchen invasions, the Goryeo king sent Lee won gu with farming equipment, and asked the locals of Usan who have fled from those invasions to return to their lands. Usan was finally abolished and fully incorporated in 1022 as all the refugees from Usan was settled to the region of Yeju.

Old Korean maps

References

Former countries in Korean history
Former countries in East Asia
History of Korea
States and territories established in the 510s
512 establishments
930s disestablishments
States and territories disestablished in the 930s
Island countries